Stuart McVicar (15 July 1918 – 13 January 1990) was a New Zealand cricketer. He played in eleven first-class matches for Wellington from 1943 to 1951.

See also
 List of Wellington representative cricketers

References

External links
 

1918 births
1990 deaths
New Zealand cricketers
Wellington cricketers
People from Woodville, New Zealand
New Zealand Services cricketers